The ICE 2 is the second series of German high-speed trains and one of six in the Intercity-Express family since 1995.

The ICE 2 (half-) trains are even closer to a conventional push–pull train than the ICE 1, because each train consists of only one locomotive (Class 402, called powerhead), six passenger cars (Classes 805 to 807) and a cab car (Class 808).

Differences to ICE 1 

Except for the automatic Scharfenberg coupling, ICE 2 powerheads are very similar to those of the ICE 1 and can actually be used in ICE 1 trains if the necessity arises.

Half-trains 
Usually two ICE 2 half-trains are coupled to form a block train of similar dimensions to the original ICE 1 for serving the main routes, and separated again to operate on routes with less traffic or to provide the passengers two different destinations.

Until the class 808 cab cars have been tested and cleared for passenger service, two ICE 2 half-trains had been solidly coupled to form a permanent block train.

Cars 
The passenger cars are very different from the ICE 1 cars, despite their similar exterior: The weight has been significantly reduced and the passenger compartments have been removed in favor of a seating arrangement similar to an airliner (due to reduced seat pitch). Also, the train has been equipped with air suspension to circumvent the wheel noise problems of the ICE 1, which led to the installation of rubber-buffered wheel rims on the ICE 1 units and therefore the Eschede train disaster.

ICE 2 trains have no service car as the class 803 on ICE 1 trains, on the other hand the class 808 cab car is unique to the ICE 2.

Service 

ICE 2 trains usually run on the main east–west line, starting in Berlin with two unit block train. In Hamm the train is separated into two half-trains.

One half-train goes through the Ruhr area to Cologne/Bonn Airport station, while the other half-train continues through Wuppertal and Cologne to Bonn. In the opposite direction, both half-trains are coupled again at Hamm.

Some trains also serve the Munich—Hanover line with halves continuing to Hamburg and Bremen respectively.

Eurotrain 

Eurotrain was a joint venture formed by Siemens and GEC-Alsthom (today Alstom) in 1996 to market high-speed rail technology in Asia. In 1997, it was one of two competitors to supply the core system of Taiwan High Speed Rail (THSR), and was awarded the status of preferred bidder by concessionaire THSRC.

In early 1998, the two companies created a demonstration train by combining cars of three existing French and German high-speed trains: ICE 2 powerheads 402 042 and 402 046, were joined at both ends to the articulated double-deck intermediate cars of TGV Duplex trainset #224.

In December 2000, THSRC decided to award the contract to the rival Taiwan Shinkansen Consortium, leading to a legal battle ending in damage payments for Eurotrain in 2004.

Upgrading of electrical traction equipment

On September 25, 2014, Mitsubishi Electric Corp. of Japan announced that it had received a contract from DB to supply new IGBT (insulated-gate bipolar transistor) power modules to replace the old GTO (Gate turn-off thyristor) power modules in the drives of 46 ICE 2 trainsets.  Mitsubishi said that the modern smaller and lighter IGBT power modules will reduce power consumption and extend the life of the ICE 2 trains. The contract for $22 million was expected to be completed by 2019.

Future

DB was to replace the ICE 2 trains with the future ICE 4 trains.  but in 2022 DB fleet planning showed all 44 currently in operation will still be in operating into 2029.

See also
 List of high-speed trains

References

External links 
 ICE 2  Siemens page

Railway coaches of Germany
Electric multiple units of Germany
Electric multiple units with locomotive-like power cars
Deutsche Bahn locomotives
Intercity Express
Train-related introductions in 1995
Passenger trains running at least at 250 km/h in commercial operations
15 kV AC multiple units